Gamma Hill is a distinctive ice-covered hill on Tabarin Peninsula, Antarctica, rising more than  on the shore of Fridtjof Sound. It is an inferred volcanic vent of the James Ross Island Volcanic Group.

The name arises from the intensive geophysical work carried out in this part of Tabarin Peninsula by the Falkland Islands Dependencies Survey in 1959–60.

References

Hills of Trinity Peninsula